The Santragachi–Anand Vihar Superfast Express is an Express train belonging to South Eastern Railway zone that runs between  and  in India. It is currently being operated with 22857/22858 train numbers on a weekly basis.

Service 

The 22857/Santragachi–Anand Vihar Weekly Superfast Express has an average speed of 58 km/hr and covers 1575 km in 27h 15m. The 22858/Anand Vihar–Santragachi Weekly Superfast Express has an average speed of 58 km/hr and covers 1575 km in 27h 15m.

Route and halts 

The important halts of the train are:

Coach composition

The train has standard LHB rakes with max speed of 130 kmph. The train consists of 18 coaches:

 1 AC II Tier
 2 AC III Tier
 8 Sleeper coaches
 5 General Unreserved
 2 End-on Generator

Traction 

Both trains are hauled by a Santragachi Loco Shed-based WAP-4 electric locomotive from Howrah to Delhi and vice versa.

Rake sharing

The train shares its rake with 22893/22894 Sainagar Shirdi–Howrah Express.

See also 

 Anand Vihar Terminal railway station
 Santragachi Junction railway station
 Sainagar Shirdi–Howrah Express

Notes

References

External links 

 22857/Santragachi - Anand Vihar Weekly SF Express India Rail Info
 22858/Anand Vihar - Santragachi Weekly SF Express India Rail Info

Rail transport in Howrah
Transport in Delhi
Express trains in India
Rail transport in Delhi
Rail transport in Uttar Pradesh
Rail transport in Bihar
Rail transport in Jharkhand
Rail transport in West Bengal
Railway services introduced in 2015